Don Lemon Tonight (formerly CNN Tonight with Don Lemon) is a late evening news commentary program which aired from 2014 to 2022 on CNN, hosted by journalist Don Lemon.

The show aired on weeknights live from 10:00pm to midnight ET.

History 

CNN Tonight first premiered in April 2014, being introduced amid a revision to CNN's primetime schedule (including the replacement of the canceled Piers Morgan Live with CNN original series and specials in the 9 p.m. hour). The series was first promoted as featuring rotating anchors presenting "a live hour of the day’s biggest stories". The program would be initially hosted by Bill Weir using the former Piers Morgan Live studio.

The CNN Tonight title had previously been used for a short-lived program in 2001 anchored by Bill Hemmer, and a transitional program that temporarily filled the time slot of Lou Dobbs Tonight after Lou Dobbs' resignation from the network in November 2009 (the timeslot was later filled by The Situation Room after a realignment to CNN's daytime lineup, until its permanent replacement, John King, USA, premiered in March).

Don Lemon had been involved in pilot runs for several potential primetime shows, including The 11th Hour, and in March 2014, The Don Lemon Show, and a special nightly 10 p.m. program to provide additional analysis of the Malaysia Airlines Flight 370 disappearance. Lemon would later become permanent host of CNN Tonight, with it developing into more of a personality-based program.

On May 17, 2021, the program was renamed Don Lemon Tonight.

On September 15, 2022, it was announced that the show would conclude in the near future, as Lemon prepares to co-anchor CNN's upcoming morning show. Alisyn Camerota and Laura Coates were named as interim hosts. 

Don Lemon Tonight aired for the final time on October 7, 2022; in his closing remarks, Lemon stated that it was a "bittersweet" moment, but didn't want to be "sad" about it, that "a lot happened between 10 and midnight, or later", and concluded the show by explaining that "sometimes it was exhausting because some of the things that we discuss here are so personal and so consuming. So, I hope I made you proud, and I thank you for tuning in all these years, and I hope that you're going to join me in the morning."

References

External links

2010s American television talk shows
2020s American television talk shows
2014 American television series debuts
2022 American television series endings
CNN original programming
English-language television shows
American live television series